Sean Leo McGoldrick is a dual player of Gaelic games who played Gaelic football for the Derry county team, with whom he won a National League title. As a dual player, he played hurling for Derry.

McGoldrick plays club football and hurling for Eoghan Rua. In football, he could play as a forward or in the half-back line. He played as a forward in hurling.

Personal life
McGoldrick went to school at Loreto College in Coleraine. His father Sean played for Antrim. His brother Barry has also played football and hurling for Derry. His sisters play camogie for Derry. His sister Grainne was nominated for Camogie All Stars in both 2006 and 2008.

Football career

Club
McGoldrick was instrumental in the Eoghan Rua side that won both the 2006 Derry Intermediate and Ulster Intermediate Championships, before losing out in the 2007 All-Ireland Intermediate Club Championship final to Ardfert of Kerry.

Inter-county
McGoldrick was part of the Derry Under-21 team that finished runners-up in both the 2006 and 2008 Ulster Under-21 Football Championship finals to Tyrone and Down respectively.

He was part of the Derry Senior panel that won the 2008 National League where Derry beat Kerry in the final.

McGoldrick and Derry also reached the National League final in 2009, but were defeated by Kerry. In that campaign he mostly played at left half back, as opposed to his usual role in the forward line.

McGoldrick retired from inter-county football in 2016 but manager Damian McErlain convinced him to return for the 2018 Ulster Senior Football Championship encounter with Donegal; McGoldrick retired again in October 2018.

School/college
McGoldrick also plays for Queen's University Belfast since 200x. The university finished runners-up to Donegal in the 2009 Dr. McKenna Cup.

Hurling career

Club
McGoldrick won both the Derry Intermediate Hurling Championship and Derry Junior Hurling Championship with Eoghan Rua in 2006.

Inter-county
McGoldrick won back-to-back Ulster Under-21 Hurling Championship medals with the Derry Under 21 team in 2007 and 2008.

He played for Derry Senior hurlers between 2007 and 2008. He was named Derry Senior Hurler of the Year for 2007.

School/college
McGoldrick won an Ulster Colleges Hurling All Star in 2005–06.

Honours

County
 Ulster Under-21 Hurling Championship (2): 2007, 2008
 National Football League (1): 2008
 Dr McKenna Cup (1): 2011

Club
 Derry Junior Hurling Championship (1): 2006
 Derry Intermediate Hurling Championship (1): 2006
 Derry Intermediate Football Championship (1): 2006
 Ulster Intermediate Club Football Championship (1): 2006

References

1987 births
Living people
Derry inter-county Gaelic footballers
Derry inter-county hurlers
Dual players
Eoghan Rua (Derry) Gaelic footballers
Eoghan Rua (Derry) hurlers
Gaelic football backs
Gaelic football forwards
Hurling forwards
People educated at Loreto College, Coleraine
People from Portstewart